S. Harris may refer to:

Sampson Willis Harris (1809-1857), American politician
Sidney Harris (born 1933), American cartoonist
Sadie Harris, fictional character from the television show Grey's Anatomy
S. Harris, co-writer with Juan Tabo of the short story "If You Were an Award, My Love"

See also
List of people with surname Harris